Warrington West is a railway station on the Liverpool–Manchester line. It is owned by Network Rail and managed by Northern Trains.

It is served by bus services and has parking for 287 cars. The station is located west of Warrington on the existing southern Liverpool–Manchester line, between Sankey for Penketh and Warrington Central.

History

Warrington Borough Council applied for funding from the Government's New Stations Fund but the bid failed. However, the council secured part of the funding through other sources and a planning application was approved in 2015, and it was hoped that construction could begin in 2016, until Network Rail increased the estimated cost by £4 million. A fresh bid to the New Stations Fund was successful, and the station opened on 16 December 2019.

Services
Services at Warrington West are operated by Northern Trains and TransPennine Express.

These services combine to give the station an off-peak service of two trains per hour in each direction. On Sundays, this is reduced to an hourly stopping service between Liverpool Lime Street and Manchester Oxford Road.

On Sundays, most TransPennine Express services call at the station, providing a roughly hourly service in each direction.

References

External links

Railway stations in Warrington
Railway stations in Great Britain opened in 2019
Northern franchise railway stations
Railway stations opened by Network Rail
Railway stations served by TransPennine Express